Mulberry Creek is a stream in Bates County in the U.S. state of Missouri. It is a tributary of the Marais des Cygnes River.

Mulberry Creek owes its name to the abundant mulberry along its course.

See also
List of rivers of Missouri

References

Rivers of Bates County, Missouri
Rivers of Missouri